Kevin Pope, born in 1958 in Carmel, Indiana is a cartoonist whose work has appeared in the pages of MAD Magazine since 1997.  He is best known to Mad readers as the artist for the "Melvin and Jenkins" series of behavioral guides.  Pope has also illustrated greeting cards, advertisements, and animation design; he worked on a Pepsi-Cola commercial that aired during the Super Bowl.  He has also created a series of humorous business gag panels titled "Fishstiks."

References

External links
Pope's official site
Complete list of Pope's work for MAD Magazine

Mad (magazine) cartoonists
Living people
American cartoonists
1958 births